Hinkles is an unincorporated community in Walker County, in the U.S. state of Georgia.

History
A post office called Hinkles was established in 1914, and remained in operation until it was discontinued in 1930. The community was named for the Hinkle family, the original landowners.

References

Unincorporated communities in Walker County, Georgia
Unincorporated communities in Georgia (U.S. state)